Post Township is one of eighteen townships in Allamakee County, Iowa, USA.  At the 2010 census, its population was 2,221.

History
Post Township was organized in 1851. It is named for Joel Post, a first settler and native of Caughnawaga, New York.

Geography
According to Iowa GenWeb records, it contains three cemeteries: Cleveland (also known as Evergreen), Minert (also known as Post Township Cemetery), and Smith (also known as Bachtel or Myron).

References

External links
 US-Counties.com
 City-Data.com

Townships in Allamakee County, Iowa
Townships in Iowa
1851 establishments in Iowa
Populated places established in 1851